Rob (Robert J.) Miller (born 1954) is an American architect.

Early life 
Rob Miller was born on March 12, 1954, in Oxford, Ohio. He made an apprenticeship as carpenter (1973–1974) and worked for several architects while in college. He received a Bachelor of Architecture from Clemson University (1976) and a Master of Architecture from Rice University with a certificate in Urban Design (1979). While in his apprenticeship, he worked occasionally as a musician.

Career 
He has been registered as an architect since 1981, taught at Georgia Institute of Technology, Emory University, and Clemson University, where he got tenure and worked as a professor through 2010. From 1997–1999 he was professor in residence at the Charles E. Daniel Center in Genoa (Italy). From 2000 to 2010 he was director of the Clemson Architecture Center in Charleston. Since 2010 he has been Director of the School of Architecture, College of Architecture, Planning and Landscape Architecture at the University of Arizona in Tucson. Miller was awarded a fellowship to the American Academy in Rome (1997) for his integrated teaching and practice. His book Implementing Architecture (Nexus Press, 1988), won the Grand Prize in Macworld's graphic design competition (1989). Miller won first prize in the competition Präsenz der Zeit-European Cultural Capital 2010 Braunschweig, Germany (2004).

Writings and researches 
 Dropping Hints: Peter Eisenman and the Inversion of Corbusian Aesthetics; in: Writing and the Architect (Charlotte: University of North Carolina, 1991).
 Stereotype and Architectural Journalism; in: Art Papers, Jan/Febr. 1996
 The Analogue and the Real: two paradigms for architectural education; in: W. Carpenter (ed), Learning the Building, New York, Van Nostrand 1997 / also in German
 The Analogue and the Real: two paradigms for architectural education; in: Ausdruck und Gebrauch, Aachen, Germany, Shaker Verlag 2003 
 Praxis als Ausbildung; in: Kl. Hornung, A. Schäfer (ed), Stadt-Bau-Kunst Braunschweig, Münster, Germany, Waxmann Verlag, 2004 / also in Spanish in: Al Fondo, La Plata, Argentina Universidad de la Plata, 2004
 Architecture is what Blows off in a Hurricane; in: Wolkenkuckucksheim | Cloud-Cuckoo-Land | Воздушный замок, Vol. 12, Issue 23, 2008
 El MINImuseum de Richard McMahan, trans. Pablo E.M. Szelagowski, 47 Al Fondo 17 (La Plata, Argentina: Universidad Nacional de la Plata), 2008, 2-13.

Works and projects 
 GRAND’S GENERAL STORE; Powder Springs, GA (1986)
 ATLANTA BAKERY INTERVENTION, NABISCO BRANDS INC.; Atlanta, GA (1988)
 CHILD WELFARE INSTITUTE; Atlanta, GA (1989) (destroyed)
 TERRI TEAGUE PHOTOGRAPHY STUDIO; Decatur, GA (1994)
 NEXUS PRESS INTERVENTION; Atlanta, GA (1997–2000)
 WILLIAMS WING; Mount Pleasant, SC (2007)
 THE MINImuseum OF RICHARD MCMAHAN (Halsey Institute of Contemporary Art) College of Charleston, assisted by David Pastre, Sean Ahern

Teaching 
Rob Miller is focused on "hybrid learning": merging educational content with professional practices. Under Miller's directorship, the Charleston Center won three NCARB Prizes for the Creative Integration of Practice and Education, plus the AIA's Best Mentoring Practices award. In 2009 Miller was awarded the Association of Collegiate Schools of Architecture’s (ACSA) Creative Achievement Award for his design/build work.

References 
 (Architecture Society of Atlanta), Implementing Architecture: Robert Miller, designer/editor, Atlanta, Nexus Press, 1988
 Court Street Center, in: Architectural Record, August 1983 and in: Inland Architect, July/Aug. 1984
 Grand's Convenience Store, in: Art Papers, July/Aug. 1987
 Nabisco Bakery Intervention, in: Progressive Architecture, March 1988
 Miniature Masterworks, in: South Carolina Architecture, 2009

External links 
 The University of Arizona, College of Architecture, Planning and Landscape Architecture

American architects
1954 births
Living people